Reina is a surname. Notable people with the surname include:

 Antonio Manuel Reina (born 1981), Spanish middle-distance runner
 Armando Betancourt Reina, Cuban journalist and author
 Carlos Roberto Reina (1926–2003), former President of Honduras
 Calcedonio Reina (1842–1911), Italian painter and poet
 Casiodoro de Reina (1520–1594), Spanish Lutheran theologian
 Daniela Reina (born 1981), Italian sprinter
 Dennis Reina (born 1950), American psychologist and author
 Domenico Reina (1796-1843), Swiss bel canto tenor
 Gaetano Reina (1889–1930), Boss of the Lucchese crime family
 Giuseppe Reina (born 1972), German footballer
 Harold Reina (born 1990), Colombian footballer
 Javier Reina (born 1989), Colombian footballer
 Juanita Reina (1925-1999), Spanish actress and singer
 Loris Reina (born 1980), French footballer
 Miguel Reina (born 1946), Spanish footballer, and father of Pepe Reina
 Miguel A. Reina (born 1980), Mexican filmmaker
 Pepe Reina (born 1982), Spanish footballer
 Ricky Reina (born 1971), English footballer
 Roger Reina, American wrestling coach
 Sergio Reina (born 1985), Colombian footballer
 Sisto Reina (died 1664), Italian composer

See also
Reina (given name)
Reina (disambiguation)